Schwechat is a city southeast of Vienna known for the Vienna International Airport and Schwechater beer. The city is home to the refineries of the Austrian national oil company OMV.

Geography 
Schwechat is named after the river Schwechat, which flows through the centre of town. The city subdivisions, called Katastralgemeinde (Cadastre), are Kledering, Mannswörth, Rannersdorf and Schwechat.

Population

History 

Home to the settlement Ala Nova of the Roman Empire, the city was first mentioned in a document in 1334. The meeting at Schwechat of Emperor Leopold I with Jan Sobieski in 1683, after the liberation of Vienna, is commemorated by an obelisk. The imperial troops defeated the Hungarian insurgents in a battle fought here in October 1848.

In 1724, a textile factory was established in Schwechat. Schwechat profited massively from the Austrian industrialisation wave of the 19th century, many of the companies established then still exist (i.e. the Dreher Brewery, founded in 1796 by Franz Anton Dreher the Younger). Schwechat became a city in 1924 and was incorporated into Vienna in 1938. The city's oil refinery was a bombing target of the Allied Oil Campaign of World War II, with the southern aviation plant complex of the Heinkel firm (Germany-based at Rostock-Schmarl as Heinkel-Nord, the Schwechat offices/facility was called Heinkel-Süd) also targeted in late 1943 and lasting through the spring of 1944.

Schwechat became an independent city in 1954. Since 2017 it belongs to Bruck an der Leitha District because Wien-Umgebung was dissolved at the end of 2016.

Economy 

Vienna International Airport and the headquarters of Austrian Airlines are in the city of Schwechat.

When Lauda Air was an independent airline, it had its corporate headquarters in Schwechat. Niki was also based in Schwechat.

Education
Schools include:

Primary schools:
Volksschule I & II
Volksschule Mannswörth
Volksschule Rannersdorf

Secondary:
Allgemeine Sonderschule Schwechat
Bundesgymnasium & Bundesrealgymnasium Schwechat
Neue Mittelschule Schwechat Frauenfeld
Neue Sport- & Sprach-Mittelschule Schwechat - Schmidgasse

Notable people

 Christopher Dibon (born 1990), footballer, ÖFB national team
 Anton Dreher senior (1810–1863), brewer, inventor of Schwechater Lagerbier
 Joseph von Eybler (1765–1846), composer and Hofkapellmeister
 Rudolf Hausleithner (1840–1918), painter
 Alfred Horn (1898–1959), mayor and freeman of Schwechat
 Viktor Klima (born 1947), Social Democrat politician, Chancellor of Austria 1997—2000
 Ernst Seidler von Feuchtenegg (1862–1931), jurist, Minister-President of Cisleithania 1917/18
 Max Stotz (1912–1943), military pilot
 Karl Trabitsch (1929–2003), politician and merchant
 Rudolf Viertl (1902—1981), football player
 Rudolf Vytlačil (1912—1977), football player
 Leopold Weinhofer (1879–1947), politician and mayor

Popular culture 

Schwechat (as Megacity Schwechat) plays an important role in the Austrian sci-fi movie Die Gstettensaga: The Rise of Echsenfriedl.

References

External links 

 Website of Schwechat 

 
Cities and towns in Bruck an der Leitha District
Oil campaign of World War II